German submarine U-20 was a Type IIB U-boat of Nazi Germany's Kriegsmarine. Her keel was laid down on 1 August 1935, by Germaniawerft of Kiel as yard number 550. She was commissioned on 1 February 1936. During World War II, she conducted operations against enemy shipping.

Design
German Type IIB submarines were enlarged versions of the original Type IIs. U-20 had a displacement of  when at the surface and  while submerged. She had two shafts and two  propellers.

U-20 was fitted with three  torpedo tubes at the bow, five torpedoes or up to twelve Type A torpedo mines, and a  anti-aircraft gun. The boat had a complement of twentyfive.

Operational history

First, second and third patrols
U-20s first three patrols involved observation (in August 1939) and the laying of mines in the North Sea and off the British east coast. She would start in Kiel and finish in Wilhelmshaven; then reverse the process.

Fourth and fifth patrols
The ship went down in 90 seconds; there was only one survivor. She also sank Ionian and Willowpool in November and December respectively, with mines laid in November.

The boat sank Sylvia northeast of Aberdeen on her fifth sortie on 13 October 1940.

Sixth to eighth patrols
U-20 sank a steady number of ships on her sixth and seventh patrols, (her eighth foray was relatively quiet), but a series of changes were on the way.

She was transferred to the U-Ausbildungsflottille as a school boat on 1 May 1940, then the Black Sea, avoiding the heavy British presence at Gibraltar and throughout the Mediterranean by being transported in sections along the Danube to the Romanian port of Galați. She was then re-assembled by the Romanians at the Galați shipyard and sent to her new home in the Black Sea so she could serve with the 30th U-boat Flotilla.

Ninth and tenth patrols
The boat's first patrol in the new environment, but her ninth overall, almost ended in disaster when she tried to torpedo a Soviet submarine chaser; the vessel responded by dropping eight depth charges. U-20 was obliged to stay submerged for four hours and returned to base with various mechanical failures.

Near the end of sally number ten, a crew member from  who had been taken sick, was transferred to U-20 on 4 August 1943. The boat docked at Constanta on the seventh.

11th to 14th patrols
These patrols were conducted between Constanta and Sevastopol. U-20 sank the Soviet Vaijan Kutur'e on 16 January 1944 off Cape Anakria.

15th patrol
The boat sank Pestel on 19 June 1944 off Trabzon. The Soviets reported that this ship was sunk in Turkish territorial waters.

She also sank the Soviet landing craft DB-26 on 26 June with gunfire and demolition charges.

16th patrol and fate
She was scuttled on 10 September 1944, in the Black Sea off the coast of Turkey.

Summary of raiding history

References

Notes

Citations

Bibliography

External links
 
 

German Type II submarines
U-boats commissioned in 1936
U-boats scuttled in 1944
World War II submarines of Germany
World War II shipwrecks in the Black Sea
1936 ships
Ships built in Kiel
Ships built in Romania
Maritime incidents in September 1944
Shipwrecks of Turkey